Juego de ilusiones is a Chilean telenovela created by Verónica Saquel y Carlos Oporto for Mega. It premiered on January 16, 2023, and stars Julio Milostich and Carolina Arregui. Filming of the telenovela began on 11 October 2022.

Cast 
 Carolina Arregui as Mariana Nazir
 Julio Milostich as Julián Mardones / Guillermo Mardones
 Alejandra Fosalba as Victoria Morán
 Loreto Valenzuela as Irene San Juan
 Patricio Achurra as Mario Jiménez
 Magdalena Müller as Sofía Mardones
 Etienne Bobenrieth as Rubén Lara
 Nathalia Aragonese as Susana Mardones
 Felipe Contreras as Ignacio Abascal
 Fernanda Finsterbusch as Javiera Mardones
 Félix Villar as Emmanuel Jiménez
 Nicolás Rojas as Joaquín Mardones
 Mónica Echeverría as Camila Mardones

Reception

Ratings

References

External links 
 

2023 telenovelas
2023 Chilean television series debuts
Chilean telenovelas
Mega (Chilean TV channel) telenovelas
Spanish-language telenovelas